Ruairí O’Connor is an Irish actor. He is known for his role as Henry Tudor, the future Henry VIII, in Starz series The Spanish Princess. He has also starred in Handsome Devil and The Conjuring: The Devil Made Me Do It.

Early life and education
O'Connor grew up in Howth, County Dublin, Ireland, until his three younger sisters, Melanie, Ella and Nicola were born. His family then moved to the countryside when he was 14 to live on a stud farm. He graduated with a bachelor's degree in acting from The Lir Academy at Trinity College Dublin in 2015.

Career
O'Connor began his career when he was cast as Niall in the Lenny Abrahamson film What Richard Did.

In 2016, he had a guest role in the RTÉ2 series Can't Cope, Won't Cope and a recurring role in the BBC Northern Ireland series My Mother and Other Strangers. He landed his first major television role as Michael Vincent in the Sky One series Delicious from 2016 to 2018. That same year, he starred as the school-bully and chief antagonist Weasel in the teen coming of age film Handsome Devil.

O'Connor starred alongside Elle Fanning in the 2018 film Teen Spirit. In May 2018, it was announced that O’Connor would play Prince Harry Tudor (later Henry VIII) in the 2019 STARZ mini-series The Spanish Princess. A second run of eight episodes was ordered by Starz and began filming in September, 2019.

O’Connor played the role of Arne Cheyenne Johnson in the 2021 release of The Conjuring: The Devil Made Me Do It. The film depicts the real life case of Johnson; the first murder defendant in American legal history to plead not guilty by reason of demonic possession.

Personal life
O'Connor lives between London and Dublin.

Filmography

Film

Television

References

External links

Ruairí O'Connor on Instagram

Living people
1991 births
21st-century Irish male actors
Alumni of Trinity College Dublin
Irish male film actors
Irish male television actors
Male actors from County Dublin
People from Howth